Luzzati is a surname. Notable people with the surname include:
 Emanuele Luzzati (1921–2007), Italian artist and filmmaker
 Mariannita Luzzati (born 1963), Brazilian visual artist
 Luigi Luzzatti (1841–1927), Italian financier and politician